Laklar is a village in Gavdul-e Markazi Rural District of the Central District of Malekan County, East Azerbaijan province, Iran. At the 2006 National Census, its population was 4,284 in 1,101 households. The following census in 2011 counted 4,601 people in 1,303 households. The latest census in 2016 showed a population of 4,767 people in 1,375 households; it was the largest village in its rural district.

References 

Malekan County

Populated places in East Azerbaijan Province

Populated places in Malekan County